The Delta Kappa Gamma Society International Headquarters Building is a historic building at 416 West 12th Street in Austin, Texas.  Since its construction in 1956, this International style building has housed the international headquarters of Delta Kappa Gamma, a professional society supporting the advancement of women founded in 1929.  It was designed by the Austin firm Kuehne, Brooks and Barr.  Architecturally, it is a C-shaped concrete and steel structure, two stories in height, with a main upper level, and a second basement level that is partially obscured by the sloping terrain of the lot.  Its design includes hallmarks of the International style propounded by Ludwig Mies van der Rohe: intersecting horizontal and vertical planes that highlight a variety of materials, including different colors of brick, concrete blocks, and marble.

The building was listed on the National Register of Historic Places in 2012.

See also
National Register of Historic Places listings in Travis County, Texas

References

External links
Delta Kappa Gamma web site

National Register of Historic Places in Austin, Texas
Buildings and structures in Austin, Texas